Tomaž Razingar (born April 25, 1979) is a retired Slovenian professional ice hockey winger.

He participated at several IIHF World Championships as a member of the Slovenia men's national ice hockey team.

Career statistics

Regular season and playoffs

International

References

External links

1979 births
EC VSV players
HC Oceláři Třinec players
HC Pustertal Wölfe players
HC Dynamo Pardubice players
HC TWK Innsbruck players
HK Acroni Jesenice players
Ice hockey players at the 2014 Winter Olympics
IF Troja/Ljungby players
Living people
Olympic ice hockey players of Slovenia
Peoria Rivermen (AHL) players
Sportspeople from Jesenice, Jesenice
Slovenian ice hockey left wingers
VHK Vsetín players
Worcester Sharks players
Slovenian expatriate ice hockey people
Slovenian expatriate sportspeople in the United States
Slovenian expatriate sportspeople in Canada
Slovenian expatriate sportspeople in the Czech Republic
Slovenian expatriate sportspeople in Italy
Slovenian expatriate sportspeople in Austria
Slovenian expatriate sportspeople in Slovakia
Slovenian expatriate sportspeople in Sweden
Slovenian expatriate sportspeople in Germany
Expatriate ice hockey players in the United States
Expatriate ice hockey players in Canada
Expatriate ice hockey players in the Czech Republic
Expatriate ice hockey players in Italy
Expatriate ice hockey players in Austria
Expatriate ice hockey players in Slovakia
Expatriate ice hockey players in Sweden
Expatriate ice hockey players in Germany
HDD Jesenice players